Kühdorf is a village and a former municipality in the district of Greiz, in Thuringia, Germany. On 1 January 2023 it became part of the municipality Langenwetzendorf.

References

Former municipalities in Thuringia
Greiz (district)